Chloe Mak (born 21 June 1995) is a Hong Kong rugby union player. She was named in Hong Kong's squad to their first-ever World Cup in 2017. She was dubbed the shortest player at the World Cup.

Biography 
Mak made her international debut against Spain in 2015. She was selected again in 2017 to play in a test match against Spain. She made the squad again in their 2018 Autumn Tour of Spain and Wales.

References 

1995 births
Living people
Hong Kong people
Hong Kong rugby union players
Hong Kong female rugby union players
Hong Kong female rugby sevens players